= Ecological Intervention =

Ecological Intervention Οικολογική Παρέμβαση Oikologiki Paremvasi
- Founded: February 2007
- Dissolved: November 2007
- Succeeded by: Ecosocialists
- Ideology: Eco-socialism; Green politics
- Political position: Left-wing

Ecological Intervention (Greek: Οικολογική Παρέμβαση) was a political party in Greece that was part of the Coalition of the Radical Left. It was created in February 2007 and participated in the Coalition of the Radical Left. The party was created by initiative of Greek ecologists, environmentalist and social movement Hoop of the People and independent activists of political ecology.

In November 2007 the party was broken and dissolved. Most of the members of the Ecological Intervention founded the political organization Ecosocialists shortly after its dissolution, continuing their participation within the broader left-wing coalition SYRIZA.
